Eupithecia fenita is a moth in the family Geometridae. It is found in south-western China (Yunnan).

The wingspan is about 17 mm. The forewings are pale brown and the hindwings are buffy white.

References

Moths described in 2004
fenita
Moths of Asia